William Henry Reid (1846–1912) was an Ontario farmer and political figure. He represented Durham West in the Legislative Assembly of Ontario from 1894 to 1898 as a Conservative-Protestant Protective Association member and then from 1898 to 1902 as a Conservative member.

Biography
He was born in Clarke Township, the son of William Reid, an immigrant from Ireland. He was educated in Clarke and Newcastle. Reid served as a member of the township council for Clarke from 1889 to 1894. He married Margaret Mulligan. Reid later served as governor for Cobourg jail.

His son Albert ("Bert") went on to serve as reeve for Clarke Township and warden for the United Counties of Northumberland and Durham.

External links 
The Canadian parliamentary companion, 1897 JA Gemmill

Clarke Township, AG Burley (1967)

1846 births
1912 deaths
People from Clarington
Progressive Conservative Party of Ontario MPPs
Protestant Protective Association MPPs